Aphrodite, the Garden of the Perfumes is a 1998 Argentine - Mali drama film directed and written by Argentine director Pablo César.

The film based on the Ancient Greek god Aphrodite is an independent film production filmed in Mali. All of the actors are from Mali and only ever appeared in this film. The film was produced by an Argentine production team.

Cast
 Issa Coulibaly
 Alejandro Da Silva
 Karamoko Sinayoko
 Hama Maiga
 Guibi Ouedraogo
 Sacko Kante
 Fatoumata Coulibaly
 Fatoumata Yerle
 Rokia Daiwara
 Yiriba Coulibaly

Release
The film premiered on 15 October 1998 in Buenos Aires. It was an independent film production and most of the actors only ever appeared in this film.

External links
 

1998 films
Argentine drama films
Bambara-language films
1998 drama films
Malian drama films
1990s Spanish-language films
1990s Argentine films